The Alyeska consortium refers to the major oil companies that own and operate the Trans-Alaska Pipeline System (TAPS) through the Alyeska Pipeline Service Company.

History
The Alaska corporation commonly known as Alyeska Pipeline Company was founded in 1970 to design, construct, operate and maintain a pipeline to transport oil from the fields on the North Slope of Alaska where oil was discovered in 1968 to an ice-free deep-water port in Valdez, Alaska. The pipeline was built between March 1975 and June 1977, running from the North Slope fields at Prudhoe Bay to the Marine Terminal at Valdez on Prince William Sound. Alyeska then went on to operate and maintain TAPS. The first oil flowed into the pipeline on June 20, 1977, and the first tanker load departed from Valdez on August 1, 1977.

Totem Marine Tug & Barge, Inc. v. Alyeska Pipeline Service Co. was argued before the Alaska Supreme Court in 1978.

The Alyeska Pipeline Service Company was partially responsible for helping to respond to the Exxon Valdez oil spill. However, Alyeska Pipeline was unprepared for the events, and consequently slow to respond with cleanup crews and equipment. Additionally, shortly before the Exxon Valdez spill, Alyeska had persuaded the Coast Guard that some safety equipment was not necessary on tankers---equipment that may have reduced the scale of the Exxon Valdez disaster.  September 2017 Alyeska had another spill due to a mix up of piping by long time employees, and dispensed anywhere from 9.5 to 38 barrels of product into the narrows of Valdez.

The thirty-year TAPS State and Federal land leases were due to expire in 2004. The State Lease was renewed for another thirty years on November 26, 2002, and a matching Federal Record of Decision for Right-of-Way was signed on January 8, 2003.

In 2016, Alyeska was ranked as an 8-way tie for 19th best of 92 oil, gas, and mining companies on indigenous rights in the Arctic.

In 2019, it was announced that BP would be selling its shares in Alyeska to Houston-based Hilcorp.

Organization
The major owner of the company is Hilcorp with 46.93% of the shares dating from the acquisition of BP. The other group members are ConocoPhillips Transportation (shares formerly owned by ARCO and acquired by Phillips during its acquisition of ARCO Alaska as part of the settlement between BP and the FTC) (28.29%), ExxonMobil (20.34%), Koch Alaska Pipeline Company (3.08%), and Unocal (1.36%). The government responsibility in regulating TAPS is managed through the Joint Pipeline Office (JPO), a consortium of thirteen federal and state agencies under the Department of the Interior.

The corporation is named after an Aleut word meaning "mainland". It is headquartered in Anchorage and has around 900 employees.

References

External links
 Alyeska Pipeline Service Company website

Trans-Alaska Pipeline System
Oil companies of the United States
Oil pipeline companies
Companies based in Anchorage, Alaska
Energy companies established in 1970
Non-renewable resource companies established in 1970
1970 establishments in Alaska
ARCO
Former BP subsidiaries